Antonino Valletta (7 October 1938 – 21 January 2022) was an Italian politician. A member of the Labour Federation, the Democrats of the Left, and the Socialist Party, he served in the Senate of the Republic from 1994 to 2001. He died in Isernia on 21 January 2022, at the age of 83.

References

1938 births
2022 deaths
20th-century Italian politicians
Italian Socialist Party politicians
Democrats of the Left politicians
Socialist Party (Italy, 1996) politicians
Senators of Legislature XIII of Italy
People from the Province of Isernia